Stephen J. Matthias (1860 – July 29, 1891) was an American professional baseball player who played in thirty-seven games for the Chicago Browns/Pittsburgh Stogies of the Union Association during the  season. He was born in Mitchellville, Maryland and died in Baltimore, Maryland.

External links

.

Baseball players from Maryland
Chicago Browns/Pittsburgh Stogies players
Major League Baseball shortstops
1860 births
1891 deaths
Bay City (minor league baseball) players
Norfolk (minor league baseball) players
Chattanooga Lookouts players
Nashville Blues players
Albany Governors players
19th-century baseball players